Native to the Isalo sandstone mountains of Madagascar, Cynanchum macrolobum is a small succulent shrub belonging to the subfamily Asclepiadoideae of the family Apocynaceae.

Description
Cynanchum macrolobum grows to about 1.3 feet tall, growing as a branching cluster of succulent stems that are near-leafless and covered in waxy, grey, wrinkled skin. Flowers are small and brown. The plant can look impressively surreal when grown alone in a shallow pot.

References

macrolobum
Endemic flora of Madagascar
Taxa named by Joseph Marie Henry Alfred Perrier de la Bâthie
Taxa named by Henri Lucien Jumelle